Recurvaria annulicornis is a moth of the family Gelechiidae. It is found in the West Indies, where it has been recorded from Saint Thomas, Bermuda and Puerto Rico.

The wingspan is about 8 mm. The forewings are pale straw-ochreous, with a slight ferruginous shade along the middle from one-third to two-thirds, and several smoky-black spots and dots, the first at the base of the costa, small and inconspicuous. There is a larger costal spot at one-third, with one, immediately above the dorsum, straight below it. There is a larger costal spot at two-thirds, with a very small one straight below it at the end of the cell, a few smaller ones lying around the apex and apical margin. The hindwings are pale grey.

References

Moths described in 1897
Recurvaria
Moths of the Caribbean